The Sir Misha Black Awards commemorate the life of Misha Black, whose work played an important role in the development of design in Britain. They are given to individuals and institutions, to honor them in their role within design education.

There are two awards – the Sir Misha Black Medal for Distinguished Services to Design Education which is awarded to design educators from anywhere in the world, and the Sir Misha Black Award for Innovation in Design Education, which is given to UK-based educational institutions, organizations or individuals.

Established by six founding bodies, the Design and Industries Association, the Imperial College, the Faculty of Royal Designers for Industry (RDI) at the RSA, the Royal Academy of Engineering, the College of Medallists and the Royal Commission for the Exhibition of 1851. These are the only awards in the world to recognize design education.

The ceremony to present the Medal began life as a biennial event but has since become an annual date recognized within the design world calendar. Nominations for the awards are welcomed from anyone with knowledge and appreciation of the value of design education. Nomination forms can be found on the Sir Misha Black Awards website.[3]

The Sir Misha Black Medal

The Sir Misha Black Medal, first awarded in 1978, was created to honour individuals across the globe who, throughout their career, have made a significant contribution to design education. The Sir Misha Black Medal is awarded collaboratively by Britain’s leading design organisations. Recipients of The Sir Misha Black Medal are automatically enrolled in the College of Medallists.

The Sir Misha Black Award

The Sir Misha Black Award for Innovation in design education, first awarded in 2001, was created to honour the exceptional work of a teacher, team, department, or course within educational establishments in the UK for innovation in design education. The award exists to acknowledge the collective excellence and leadership in design education within the United Kingdom that has long been held in high regard internationally, but has received little formal recognition.

The Awards Committee

The committee comprises leading industry design educators and representatives of renowned associations. The current committee as of 2020 includes:

Mary V. Mullin (Chairman) – The Design and Industries Association, 
Professor Peter Childs, FREng, FIMechE, FASME - The Imperial College of London,
Professor Sir Christopher Frayling – College of Medallists, 
Professor Malcolm Garrett MBE RDI, FISTD – The Faculty of Royal Designers for Industry, 
Professor Geoffery Kirk RDI, FREng – The Royal Academy of Engineering,
Professor Chris Wise, RDI, FREng - Royal Commission for the Exhibition of 1851,
and 
Dr Nick de Leon – Co-Opted Member.

Recipients of the Sir Misha Black Medal

Recipients of The Sir Misha Black Award

Design awards
Educational awards in the United Kingdom
Awards established in 1978
1978 establishments in the United Kingdom